Golich Juma Wario is a Kenyan politician. He is the current senator representing Tana River County.

References 

Living people
Members of the Senate of Kenya
Year of birth missing (living people)